Lars Bo (29 May 1924 in Kolding – 21 October 1999 in Paris) was a Danish artist and writer. He is known for his graphic works with surrealistically inspired fantastic motifs. He was nicknamed "Wizard".

Lars Bo worked with P. Rostrup Bøyesen at Statens Museum for Kunst in the period from 1939 to 1940, and he went to The Danish Design School from 1941 to 1943, after which he travelled in Europe. From 1947 until his death in 1999 he lived in Paris.

From 1948 to 1950 Lars Bo worked in Johnny Friedläender and Albert Flocons graphic studio in Paris. Lars Bo wrote the novel Det vidunderlige hus i Paris (The Wonderful House in Paris).

Lars Bo moved to Paris in the early 1950s to study art and printmaking techniques at the famous Atelier 17, under the directorship of Stanley William Hayter. Bo began a long and successful career as an artist of the illustrated book in 1952. Until 1996 he produced etchings and aquatints for many great illustrated books. Some of his greatest works in this field are for classic editions of Hans Christian Andersen.

Lars Bo began exhibiting his individual prints and paintings in Paris in 1954. Shortly thereafter he became a leading artist for the French periodical, Le Monde. By 1960 Bo had established an international reputation (especially for his original prints) and exhibitions of his art were held in England, the United States and Japan.

Collections 

 Art Museum of Southeast Texas, Beaumont, Texas

External links 
images

1924 births
1999 deaths
Modern printmakers
20th-century Danish painters
Danish surrealist artists
20th-century Danish illustrators
Danish male novelists
Danish resistance members
Burials at Père Lachaise Cemetery
20th-century Danish novelists
20th-century printmakers
Atelier 17 alumni
20th-century Danish male writers
People from Kolding
Danish expatriates in France